Cleistopholis is a genus of flowering plants belonging to the family Annonaceae.

Its native range is Western Tropical Africa to Angola.

Species:

Cleistopholis glauca 
Cleistopholis patens 
Cleistopholis staudtii

References

Annonaceae
Annonaceae genera